First Folio Theatre is a not-for-profit theater company affiliated with the  Actors' Equity Association.  Founded in 1996, First Folio, originally named First Folio Shakespeare Festival, is located on the grounds of the Mayslake Peabody Estate in Oak Brook, Illinois, United States.   First Folio utilizes the "Folio Method" as developed by Patrick Tucker (at one time of the Royal Shakespeare Company), who first introduced his approach to American actors, directors and teachers in a series of workshops sponsored by the Riverside Shakespeare Company of New York City at The Shakespeare Center beginning in 1982, which led to an awakened interest in the First Folio.

The Folio Method employs the text of William Shakespeare's First Folio to illuminate the textual clues for the actors and the audience.

First Folio Theatre is listed as a Major Festival in the book Shakespeare Festivals Around the World by Marcus D. Gregio (Editor), 2004.

After 25 years in operation, First Folio Theatre will cease operations with its last performance on April 8, 2023, due to the retirement of its Founding Executive Director David Rice. https://firstfolio.org/26th-season-preview/

Performance venues 
First Folio Theatre currently performs in the Event Hall of the historic Mayslake Peabody Estate.  Its first venue was its outdoor stage, built in 1997 and located adjacent to the beautiful Portiuncula Chapel.  Lawn seating allowed up to 500 audience members to enjoy a picnic while they watched Shakespeare-under-the-stars.  The second venue was First Folio's chamber theater, opened in 2004 and located in the formal library of Mayslake Hall.  With seating for 80, this venue was used for more intimate productions.  The third venue is the Event Hall, opened in 2008 and located in the Retreat Wing of Mayslake Hall.  This venue seats up to 130 and is First Folio's primary indoor venue.

Educational outreach 
Along with their formal stagings, First Folio's Educational Outreach program also offered four educational touring shows and an artist-in-residence program. The four touring shows included Master Shakespeare and His Stories, designed for grade-school aged children; Shakespeare's Warring and Wooing, The Fifty Minute Midsummer Night's Dream, and Edgar Allan Poe and the Tell-Tale Heart, all geared toward middle and high school students. First Folio gave over 250 performances of their touring shows for over 125,000 students throughout Illinois and Iowa.  These programs were included in the  Illinois Arts Council's Arts Tour Roster.  First Folio's outreach program was chosen as the Artists-in-Residence for the Quad Cities Arts Program in November 2006.

Past performances

1997
The Tempest

1998
A Midsummer Night's Dream

1999
The Taming of the Shrew

2000
Romeo and Juliet
Much Ado About Nothing

2001
Macbeth
As You Like It

2002
Antigone
Twelfth Night

2003
The Comedy of Errors

2004
Hamlet
A Midsummer Night's Dream

2005
The Importance of Being Earnest
The Taming of the Shrew
A Connecticut Yankee in King Arthur's Court

2006
Private Lives
The Tempest
The Madness of Edgar Allan Poe: A Love Story

2007
Angel Street
Richard III
The Madness of Edgar Allan Poe: A Love Story

2008
Jeeves Intervenes
Driving Miss Daisy
Much Ado About Nothing

2009
Design for Living
A Moon for the Misbegotten 
Macbeth
The Castle of Otranto

2010
Jeeves in Bloom
Will Rogers: An American Original
Twelfth Night 
The Madness of Edgar Allan Poe

2011
Blithe Spirit
The Woman in Black
Romeo and Juliet
Tea at Five

2012
Unnecessary Farce
The Turn of the Screw
The Merchant of Venice
Shylock and His Daughter
The Madness of Edgar Allan Poe

2013
Jeeves Takes a Bow
Underneath the Lintel
Cymbeline: A Musical Folktale
The Rainmaker

2014
Rough Crossing
Salvage
The Merry Wives of Windsor
The Gravedigger

2015
Laughter on the 23rd Floor
Love, Loss, and What I Wore
The Winter's Tale
The Madness of Edgar Allan Poe

2022-2023 season
Jeeves Intervenes
Louisa May Alcott's Little Women
And Neither Have I Wings to Fly
Twelfth Night

References

Oak Brook, Illinois
Theatres in Illinois
Theatres in Chicago
Theatre companies in Chicago